Thenmala is a town in Kerala, India.

It may also refer to:
 Thenmala dam, a dam in Kerala.
 Thenmala railway station, a railway statio in Kerala.